Apagomerella is a genus of longhorn beetles of the subfamily Lamiinae, containing the following species:

 Apagomerella dissimilis Galileo & Martins, 2005
 Apagomerella versicolor (Boheman, 1859)

References

Hemilophini